David Hess  (29 November 1770, Zurich – 11 April 1843, Unterstrass) was a Swiss writer, caricaturist, and politician.

Life 
Hess grew up on a country estate, the Beckenhof, in Zurich-Unterstrass. His father, Johann Rudolf Hess, was a Dutch officer stationed in Zurich.  His mother, Martha de la Tour, was the daughter of a French mining engineer.  In accordance with his father's wishes, Hess pursued a military career from 1787 to 1796 as a Swiss Guard in Holland.

He was witness to the massacre at the Swiss garden by French revolutionary troops, which made him a decided opponent of the revolution. In 1796 David Hess returned to Zurich. He saw the invasion of French troops and the end of the Old Swiss Confederation while serving as a captain with the Zurich troops in Aarberg, but did not take part in the battle of Berne or the battle at Grauholz.

In May of the following year he married Anna Hirzel. She died in 1802 after the birth of their second child. In 1805 he married Salome Vischer.

In September 1798 during the second battle for Zurich, foreign soldiers were quartered on his estate - an unpleasant consequence of the Helvetic Republic.  He would later participate in a campaign against billeting. At the beginning of the mediation period in 1803, David Hess again took part in politics.  From 1803 to 1830 he was a member of the Zurich Cantonal Parliament, although he was not particularly active in it.

He had a wide circle of acquaintances, including Johann Martin Usteri, Johann Gottfried Ebel, the young Conrad Ferdinand Meyer, and Philipp Christoph Kayser. And as a member of the Zurich artist's society, he was considered an anchor of the city's cultural life. In his last years he withdrew more and more into reading. He died on 11 April 1843 at his estate.

Works 
In 1795 a collection of twenty cartoons called Hollandia Regenerata were published in London. These criticized the Batavian Republic. Another target of his many unpublished cartoons were the Zurich government and Napoleon Bonaparte.  In 1801 he published a successful collection of caricatures under the pseudonym David Hildebrand.

In addition to his own diary, Hess wrote a biography of Salomon Landolt, the governor of Greifensee. In his entertaining 1818 work "Badenfahrt" (Trip to Baden), Hess described the city of Baden and its baths. He also drew all of its illustrations.

He remained a sharp critic of post-revolutionary conditions and democratic aspirations.  In 1832, when protesters of the Industrial Revolution set fire to a mechanical spinning factory in Uster, he commented mockingly:

 "You know the people aren't too bright
 when even in broad daylight,
 the party in Uster couldn't be celebrated
 until it were illuminated."

References

External links 
 
 Lambiek Comiclopedia article.

Swiss caricaturists
Swiss illustrators
18th-century Swiss painters
18th-century Swiss male artists
18th-century Swiss writers
Swiss male painters
19th-century Swiss painters
Swiss politicians
1770 births
1843 deaths
19th-century Swiss male artists